Wyoming Hill is an MBTA Commuter Rail station on the Haverhill Line, located in Wyoming Square near downtown Melrose, Massachusetts. The station has two low-level side platforms and is not accessible. Wyoming Hill, in addition to the two other commuter rail stops in Melrose, was originally intended to be an extension of the Orange Line further north to Reading, Massachusetts.

History

The Boston and Maine Railroad (B&M) opened its line from Wilmington Junction to Boston on July 1, 1845. Boardman's Crossing station opened on Wyoming Avenue in North Malden then or soon thereafter. Melrose split from Malden in 1850 due to development around the rail line. In the 1850s, the station was renamed Wyoming. The station building was located on the west side of the tracks just south of Wyoming Avenue.

The new station was built of light buff-colored brick, with red Longmeadow sandstone as trim and a slate roof. The architect was Henry B. Fletcher. The new station opened on February 24, 1901, at a final cost of $25,000.

The station building was partially converted to a warehouse by 1962, and was demolished by 1977. The MBTA, formed in 1964 to subsidize suburban commuter rail service, began funding Reading Line service on January 18, 1965. Around 1978, the MBTA modified the names of several stations for clarity, with Wyoming station becoming Wyoming Hill.

References

External links

MBTA - Wyoming Hill
Station from Wyoming Avenue from Google Maps Street View

Buildings and structures in Melrose, Massachusetts
MBTA Commuter Rail stations in Middlesex County, Massachusetts
Railway stations in the United States opened in 1845